Dover Street is a street in Mayfair, London. The street is notable for its Georgian architecture as well as the location of historic London clubs and hotels, which have been frequented by world leaders and historic figures in the arts. It also hosts a number of contemporary art galleries. An equestrian sculpture by Elisabeth Frink stands on the junction of Dover Street and Piccadilly, opposite the Ritz Hotel.

Location 
The street lies in the south of Mayfair in the West End. To the south-east, the street adjoins the major thoroughfare of Piccadilly. To the north-west, it runs up past Stafford Street to the junction with Hay Hill, then continues as Grafton Street. To the north-east is Albemarle Street, running parallel with Dover Street and the location of the Royal Institution. South-west is Berkeley Street (adjoining Berkeley Square to the north), also running in parallel.

The nearest tube station is Green Park.

History 
Dover Street was built by a syndicate of developers headed by Sir Thomas Bond. The syndicate purchased a Piccadilly mansion called Clarendon House from Christopher Monck, 2nd Duke of Albemarle in 1683 and proceeded to demolish the house and develop the area. At that time the house backed onto open fields and the development of the various estates in Mayfair was just getting underway. The syndicate also built Bond Street and Albemarle Street. The street is named after Henry Jermyn, 1st Baron Dover, one of the partners in the syndicate.

In June 1797 John Nash moved into 28 Dover Street, a building of his own design; he built an even bigger house next door at 29 into which he moved the following year. Edward Moxon moved from premises he had established in 1830 in New Bond Street to 44 Dover Street. He published Wordsworth from 1835 onwards and in 1839 issued the first complete edition of Shelley's poems. In 1841, he was found guilty of blasphemy for passages in  Shelley's Queen Mab. Anne Lister (1791–1840), a notable Victorian landowner and diarist, liked to stay at Hawkins, located at 26 Dover Street.

Brown's Hotel (then termed a "genteel inn") was established in 1837 by James Brown, Lord Byron's valet, who took a lease on 23 Dover Street to cater for those who were in town "for the Season". He ran it with his wife, Sarah Willis, the personal maid of Lady Byron, who gave financial support. The hotel was later enlarged and joined with backing premises on Albemarle Street. In 1876, Alexander Graham Bell made the first successful telephone call in Britain from the hotel. In 1890, The International Niagara Commission met in the hotel and their decision on distributing "Niagara power" subsequently led to the adoption of the alternating current worldwide. Other guests have included Napoleon III,  Theodore Roosevelt (at the time of his marriage), Rudyard Kipling and Agatha Christie (her book At Bertram's Hotel is based on Brown's).

Oliver Wendell Holmes in Our Hundred Days in Europe records staying at Mackellar's Hotel, 17 Dover Street, where "we found ourselves comfortably lodged and well cared for during the whole time we were in London".

Frédéric Chopin took lodgings in Dover Street in 1848 and performed a number of piano recitals in London and undertook piano lessons.

In the 1920s many notable photographers were based in Dover Street including Paul Tanqueray, Hugh Cecil and Alexander Bassano. Marcus Adams, Yvonne Gregory and Bertram Park, the "Three Photographers", were based at 43 Dover Street.

Green Park Underground station was originally known as Dover Street station. The original Leslie Green-designed building was located in Dover Street, but, following refurbishment in the 1930s to install escalators, the entrance was moved to Piccadilly and the station was renamed.

Clubs
The street is historically and currently the location of a number of well-known London clubs, although the oldest and most fashionable London clubs are located in St James's and Pall Mall:
 The Albemarle Club, originally in Albemarle Street nearby, was relocated to 37 Dover Street before its closure.
 The Arts Club, founded by Charles Dickens and others in 1863, originally in Hanover Square, has been located at 40 Dover Street since 1893. Whistler's decision to sue John Ruskin was made on the premises. The Arts Club premises are currently used for meetings of the Eccentric Club.
 The Bath Club, where Mark Twain breakfasted.
 The Capisce Club, 1 Dover Street, was formerly a nightclub and restaurant.
 Mahiki, 1 Dover Street, is a nightclub and bar, with a Polynesian and tiki theme, predominantly specialising in rum. Often frequented by celebrities and royalty, including Prince William.
 Empress Club, 35 Dover Street, Towards the end of the 19th century, the idea of a London club solely for women, was put forward by one of Queen Victoria's Ladies-in-Waiting, With the help of other Ladies at Court, and indeed with the blessing of the Queen herself, the idea went ahead, and on 24 May 1897 the Empress Club opened – founded the “Ladies of England” and in commemoration of her Majesty's Golden Jubilee.  The club's foundation marked a new era in the history of Ladies’ Clubs. Unconnected with any political movement it soon became a powerful Social Institution. Headed by the Duchess of Leeds, the vice-presidents and Committee included a Princess and several Countesses.

The original clubhouse was at 32 Dover Street, such was the rush to join that within 12 months a new site had to be found on which to erect a building worthy of the large and influential membership which represented nearly every known family of distinction.
The site found was at No. 35, almost next door, and by 1901 the Empress Club was installed in a most impressive and palatial building with another entrance in Berkley Street. It boasted12 Reception Rooms, handsomely decorated, and one hundred bedrooms for which the lowest charge was 4/- a night- and this included Lights, Boots, Bath, and attendance. Coal fires, it is true, were 1/6 extra but Ladies’ Maids could be accommodated for 7/6 per day!
Members wishing to interview servants at the club had to give two clear days’ notice to the Secretary and then conduct the interview before 12 noon. Ladies could keep their cycles at the club, but dogs were not allowed and Gentlemen guests only as far as the Dining and Drawing Rooms. An orchestra played during afternoon tea (1/-) and smoking was permitted.
It also played in the Grand Dining Hall during dinner, after which smoking was again allowed. Luncheon was 2/6 and dinner 3/6! During the great war over £50,000 was raised by members in aid to the Forces, and again £16,000 in World War II. The Club withstood many near misses from bombs and suffered considerable damage from a fire in 1941
After the war the Club never quite recovered its former glory and some years later it was sold. Most of the building was turned into offices and the Grand Dining Hall became a Night Club.
In 1961 this was acquired by the Caprice - A l’Ecu de France group, where it became the Empress Restaurant. The property is currently occupied by Christian Louboutin.

And a fictional one:

 The Drones Club, the gentlemen's club of many of P. G. Wodehouse's novels, was located on Dover Street, off Piccadilly.

Galleries
Art galleries in the street include:

 The Alexia Goethe Gallery, 5–7 Dover Street.
 The CCA Galleries, 8 Dover Street — originally Christies Contemporary Art and now an independent company publishing prints.
 The Gallery at 32 Dover Street (now part of Wolf & Badger).
 Richard Green, 39 Dover Street.
 The Institute of Contemporary Arts (ICA) was initially in Dover Street, but relocated to The Mall in 1968.
 The Wapping Project Bankside, 37 Dover St, in the same building as Mallett Antiques.

References

External links 

 
 LondonTown.com information

Mayfair
Streets in the City of Westminster
Dover Street
Art gallery districts